Bethany Bryan (born 23 April 1993) is a British rower from Teesside. She won a bronze medal in the quad scull at the 2017 European Rowing Championships. She won a bronze medal at the 2017 World Rowing Championships in Sarasota, Florida, as part of the quadruple sculls with Mathilda Hodgkins-Byrne, Jessica Leyden and Holly Nixon.

References

External links

Bethany Bryan at British Rowing

Living people
1993 births
British female rowers
World Rowing Championships medalists for Great Britain
European Rowing Championships medalists